John Richard Morgan (born 16 March 1977) is a former English cricket. Morgan was a right-handed batsman who was a right arm medium-fast bowler. He was born at Hastings, Sussex. He was the son of Richard Ashley Morgan.

Morgan represented the Sussex Cricket Board in List A cricket. His debut List A game came against Herefordshire in the 2000 NatWest Trophy. From 2000 to 2002, he represented the Board in 7 List A matches, the last of which came against the Worcestershire Cricket Board in the 2nd round of the 2003 Cheltenham & Gloucester Trophy which was held in 2002. In his 7 List A matches, he took 10 wickets at a bowling average of 22.40, with best figures of 4/55.

References

External links
John Morgan at Cricinfo
John Morgan at CricketArchive

1977 births
Living people
Sportspeople from Hastings
English cricketers
Sussex Cricket Board cricketers